The  New Orleans VooDoo season was the fifth season for the franchise in the Arena Football League. The team was coached by Derek Stingley until his firing on June 26. The VooDoo played their home games at New Orleans Arena. This was the first season for the VooDoo since 2008, after the league went on hiatus in 2009 and the franchise was not active in 2010. The VooDoo went 3–15, missing the playoffs, and finishing with the worst record in the league.

Standings

Season schedule

Preseason

Regular season
The VooDoo began the season at home against the Tampa Bay Storm on March 11. They will visit the Orlando Predators in their final regular season game on July 23.

Regular season

Week 1: vs. Tampa Bay Storm

Week 2: vs. Orlando Predators

Week 3: at Jacksonville Sharks

Week 4: vs. Georgia Force

Week 5: BYE

Week 6: at Cleveland Gladiators

Week 7: vs. Pittsburgh Power

Week 8: at Chicago Rush

Week 9: at Kansas City Command

Week 10: vs. Tulsa Talons

Week 11: vs. Arizona Rattlers

Week 12: at Philadelphia Soul

Week 13: vs. Jacksonville Sharks

Week 14: BYE

Week 15: at Georgia Force

Week 16: vs. Spokane Shock

Week 17: at Tampa Bay Storm

Week 18: vs. Milwaukee Mustangs

Week 19: at Utah Blaze

Week 20: at Orlando Predators

References

New Orleans VooDoo
New Orleans VooDoo seasons
New Orleans VooDoo